Armona is a census-designated place (CDP) in Kings County, California, United States. It is part of the Hanford–Corcoran Metropolitan Statistical Area. The population was 4,156 at the 2010 census. Armona's motto is "Small and Loud".

Geography
California State Route 198 runs through the community, leading east into Hanford, the county seat, and west  to Lemoore.

History
The name "Armona" was applied to a railroad station in the 1880s. It was subsequently transferred to the present location on the Southern Pacific Railroad in 1891. Reportedly, the name was coined by transposing the first two letters of the name "Ramona".

The first school in the Armona vicinity was the Giddings School built in 1880. The Giddings School District was renamed Armona in 1907. A new brick school house was constructed in the early 1920s. As that structure did not comply with California's earthquake standards (the Field Act), it was replaced in 1953 with what is now the Armona Elementary School.

The Armona post office was established in 1887.

Demographics

2010
The 2010 United States Census reported that Armona had a population of 4,156. The racial makeup of Armona was 2,058 (49.5%) White, 99 (2.4%) African American, 64 (1.5%) Native American, 85 (2.0%) Asian, 13 (0.3%) Pacific Islander, 1,597 (38.4%) from other races, and 240 (5.8%) from two or more races. Hispanic or Latino of any race were 2,784 persons (67.0%).

The Census reported that 4,156 people (100% of the population) lived in households, 0 (0%) lived in non-institutionalized group quarters, and 0 (0%) were institutionalized.

There were 1,152 households, out of which 640 (55.6%) had children under the age of 18 living in them, 641 (55.6%) were opposite-sex married couples living together, 214 (18.6%) had a female householder with no husband present, 106 (9.2%) had a male householder with no wife present.  There were 105 (9.1%) unmarried opposite-sex partnerships, and 5 (0.4%) same-sex married couples or partnerships. 147 households (12.8%) were made up of individuals, and 51 (4.4%) had someone living alone who was 65 years of age or older. The average household size was 3.61.  There were 961 families (83.4% of all households); the average family size was 3.88.

The age distribution of the population shows 1,421 people (34.2%) under the age of 18, 438 people (10.5%) aged 18 to 24, 1,089 people (26.2%) aged 25 to 44, 902 people (21.7%) aged 45 to 64, and 306 people (7.4%) who were 65 years of age or older.  The median age was 28.7 years. For every 100 females, there were 92.3 males.  For every 100 females age 18 and over, there were 88.4 males.

The homeowner vacancy rate was 1.1%; the rental vacancy rate was 4.1%.  2,645 people (63.6% of the population) lived in owner-occupied housing units and 1,511 people (36.4%) lived in rental housing units.

2000
As of the census of 2000, there were 3,239 people, 961 households, and 786 families residing in the CDP. The racial makeup of the CDP was 56.25% White, 4.29% Black or African American, 2.41% Native American, 1.33% Asian, 0.25% Pacific Islander, 29.98% from other races, and 5.50% from two or more races.  48.60% of the population were Hispanic or Latino of any race.

There were 961 households, out of which 47.8% had children under the age of 18 living with them, 58.5% were married couples living together, 16.0% had a female householder with no husband present, and 18.2% were non-families. 13.5% of all households were made up of individuals, and 5.7% had someone living alone who was 65 years of age or older.  The average household size was 3.37 and the average family size was 3.68.

In the CDP, the age distribution of the population shows 35.4% under the age of 18, 9.7% from 18 to 24, 29.3% from 25 to 44, 18.6% from 45 to 64, and 7.1% who were 65 years of age or older.  The median age was 28 years. For every 100 females, there were 94.2 males.  For every 100 females age 18 and over, there were 91.6 males.

Economy
At the time of the 2000 census, the median income for a household in the CDP was $32,790, and the median income for a family was $32,232. Males had a median income of $26,905 versus $22,981 for females. The per capita income for the CDP was $11,850.  About 24.2% of families and 26.6% of the population were below the poverty line, including 37.8% of those under age 18 and 8.9% of those age 65 or over.  The estimated unemployment rate was 13.1% in November 2016.

Transportation

Bus 
Kings Area Regional Transit (KART) operates regularly scheduled fixed route bus service, vanpool service for commuters and Dial-A-Ride (demand response) services throughout Kings County as well as to Fresno .

Major highway 
 Highway 198

Rail 
Freight service is available from the San Joaquin Valley Railroad, which passes through Armona.

Education
Public schools in the community are operated by the Armona Union Elementary School District. They include:
Armona Elementary School
Parkview Middle School

The district also sponsors the Crossroads Charter Academy, a K-12 independent study charter school.

There is one K-12 private school, Armona Union Academy, which is operated by the Seventh-day Adventist Church.

Armona is in the Hanford Joint Union High School District.

Nearby community colleges include West Hills College Lemoore and the Hanford center of College of the Sequoias.

Government

In the United States House of Representatives, Armona is in California's 21st District and is represented by Democrat TJ Cox. Armona is represented on the Kings County Board of Supervisors by Craig Pedersen.

Notable people
Lyn Lary (Lynford Hobart Lary) was born on January 28, 1906, in Armona. He died January 9, 1973, in Downey, California. He played shortstop for six different teams in his twelve-year career in Major League Baseball, beginning his rookie year on May 11, 1929, with the New York Yankees. His final game was on August 7, 1940, with the St. Louis Browns. He played in the 1932 World Series with the Yankees alongside Babe Ruth, Lou Gehrig and Murderers' Row. Lary finished MVP in voting twice in 1935 as 24th and in 1937 as 19th.

Lance George Brown, born October 10, 1980, in Hanford. He grew up in Armona, attending both Armona Elementary School and Parkview Middle School, and attended Lemoore High School. He was a journeyman offensive lineman and defensive lineman playing minor league football nationally, professional Indoor Arena Football, and in the European Federation of American Football. In 2008 he left playing and began his career as a professional Indoor Arena Football coach. During the winter of 2008 he was inducted into the Minor League Football News Hall of Fame as a player. In 2022 Lance was named Head Men's & Women's Wrestling Coach at Jarvis Christian University in East Texas. The University is a HBCU and will have the first Women's Wrestling program in HBCU history in the Country.

Notable sites
Raven's Deli, located on 14th Avenue and operated by Bill Raven and his family, produces various meats and foodstuffs. Raven's Brand jerky is sold throughout the region and easily recognized by its distinctive taste and black raven on a bright yellow background on the otherwise clear bag. Raven's also markets its own line of meat seasonings that is sold at local grocery stores.

The United Methodist Church was constructed in 1910.

References

External links
Armona Union Elementary School District
Armona Union Academy

Census-designated places in Kings County, California
Census-designated places in California